Robert Perkins (born 29 May 1994) is an Australian professional baseball catcher for the Canberra Cavalry of the Australian Baseball League.

Career
Perkins plays in the Australian Baseball League for the Canberra Cavalry. He signed a minor league contract with the Colorado Rockies in January 2012. He made his professional debut in 2013 for the Grand Junction Rockies and spent the whole season there, batting .162/.234/.265 with three home runs and 12 RBIs in 35 games. He spent 2014 with Tri-City Dust Devils where he compiled a .202 batting average with one home runs and seven RBIs in 38 games. Perkins spent the 2015 season with the Asheville Tourists where he posted a .200 batting average with one home run and 14 RBIs in 41 games, and 2016 with the Modesto Nuts where he slashed .238/.396/.310 in only 15 games due to injury.

During the 2016-17 Australian Baseball League season, Perkins was named the Cavalry's most valuable player. He spent 2017 with Asheville, the Albuquerque Isotopes, and the Lancaster JetHawks where he batted a combined .222 with five home runs and 18 RBIs in 53 games between the three teams. Perkins elected for free agency on 2 November 2018.

International career
Perkins was selected for the Australian national baseball team at the 2017 World Baseball Classic Qualification in 2016 and 2019 WBSC Premier12.

References

External links

1994 births
Living people
Albuquerque Isotopes players
Asheville Tourists players
Australian expatriate baseball players in the United States
Baseball catchers
Canberra Cavalry players
Grand Junction Rockies players
Hartford Yard Goats players
Lancaster JetHawks players
Modesto Nuts players
Sportspeople from Canberra
Tri-City Dust Devils players
2017 World Baseball Classic players
2023 World Baseball Classic players